Radar Fence Transponder (also called Navy-OSCAR 60 or RAFT 1) was an amateur radio satellite that was developed and built for training purposes at the United States Naval Academy. The  heavy RAFT had a cubic structure of  edge length and therefore did not meet the Cubesat standard. Solar cells on all six sides of the satellite were used to supply energy. It had neither position control nor drive systems.

RAFT contained a receiver at 216.98 MHz for calibration experiments of the U.S. Navy Space Surveillance Radar. For amateur radio connections there was an AX.25 digipeater on 145.825 MHz with built-in speech synthesizer on board.

Two fixed antennas equipped with springs were used for communication and also as a separation system for the almost identical sister satellite MARScom.

Mission
The satellite was released on 21 December 2006 with Space Shuttle Discovery (STS-116) from Kennedy Space Center, Florida.

On 30 May 2007, it was re-entered on Earth atmosphere.

See also

 OSCAR

References

External links

Spacecraft launched by the Space Shuttle
Amateur radio satellites
Spacecraft launched in 2006